Jonathan "Joe" James Glanfield (born 6 August 1979, London Borough of Sutton) is a sailing competitor from Great Britain.  He won a silver medal at both the 2004 Athens and 2008 Beijing Olympics with Nick Rogers in the 470 class. He also came 4th in the 2000 Olympics.

References

External links
 

1979 births
Living people
English male sailors (sport)
Sailors at the 2000 Summer Olympics – 470
Sailors at the 2004 Summer Olympics – 470
Sailors at the 2008 Summer Olympics – 470
Olympic sailors of Great Britain
British male sailors (sport)
Olympic silver medallists for Great Britain
Olympic medalists in sailing
Medalists at the 2008 Summer Olympics
Medalists at the 2004 Summer Olympics